The Roadhouse was a Classic Country radio station on Sirius Satellite Radio channel 62, XM Satellite Radio channel 10 and DISH Network channel 6062.  As of February 9, 2010, Direct TV dropped Sirius XM programming in favor of SonicTap.

Originally airing only on Sirius, the channel was added to the XM platform (replacing XM's America) in November 2008.

From December 7-December 25, 2009, the Roadhouse was temporarily pre-empted for "Country Christmas", a format of country Christmas music.

On May 4, 2011, The Roadhouse and Willie's Place was merged to make Willie's Roadhouse. Willie's Roadhouse will take over the Grand Ole Opry broadcasts on Friday and Saturday nights.

Programs
Bill Anderson Visits with the Legends, Country Hall of Fame member Bill Anderson talks with and looks at influential moments and people in the history of country music.
The Grand Ole Opry, encore presentations of the Grand Ole Opry performances, which aired live on Nashville! XM11.

Sirius Satellite Radio channels
XM Satellite Radio channels
Digital-only radio stations
Country radio stations in the United States
Radio stations established in 2001
Radio stations disestablished in 2011
Defunct radio stations in the United States